A design museum is a museum with a focus on product, industrial, graphic, fashion and architectural design.
Many design museums were founded as museums for applied arts or decorative arts and started only in the late 20th century to collect design.

The first museum of this kind was the Victoria and Albert Museum in London. In Germany the first museum of decorative arts was the Deutsches-Gewerbe-Museum zu Berlin (now Kunstgewerbemuseum), founded in 1868 in Berlin.

Also some museums of contemporary or modern art have important design collections, like the MoMA in New York, the Centre Pompidou in Paris. 
A special concept has been realised in the Pinakothek der Moderne in Munich, in which four independent museums cooperate, one of them being Die Neue Sammlung – the largest design museum in the world.

Today corporate museums like the Vitra Design Museum, Museo Alessi or Museo Kartell play an important role.

List of design museums 
Archivo Diseño y Arquitectura, Mexico City
Design Museum of Chicago, Chicago
Design Museum Dharavi, India
Cooper Hewitt, Smithsonian Design Museum, New York
Design Museum Gent, Belgium
Art & Design Atomium Museum, Brussels 
Design Museum, London
Danish Museum of Art & Design, Copenhagen
Swedish Centre for Architecture and Design, Stockholm
Swedish Design Museum (virtual), Sweden
Die Neue Sammlung, Germany
Leipzig Museum of Applied Arts, Germany
Bauhaus Archive, Berlin
Martin-Gropius-Bau, Berlin
Kunstgewerbemuseum Berlin, Germany
Museum für angewandte Kunst Frankfurt, Germany
Museum für angewandte Kunst Cologne, Germany
Museum für angewandte Kunst Wien, Austria
Museum of Decorative Arts in Prague, Czech Republic
Museum of Design Atlanta, Atlanta
Museum of Applied Arts (Belgrade), Serbia
Museum of Applied Arts (Budapest), Hungary
Museum of Arts and Design, New York
Powerhouse Museum, Sydney
Röhsska Museum, Gothenburg, Sweden
SONS Museum, a museum dedicated to shoe design, Kruishoutem, Belgium
Singapore City Gallery, Singapore
Red Dot Design Museum, Singapore
Stieglitz Museum of Applied Arts, Saint Petersburg, Russia
Triennale (Milan), Italy
ADI Design Museum (Milan), Italy
21 21 Design Sight, Tokyo
Design Museum Holon, Tel Aviv, Israel
Design Exchange, Toronto
Taiwan Design Museum, Taipei, Taiwan
Wolfsonian-FIU
Victoria and Albert Museum
V&A Dundee, Dundee, Scotland

References

External links
"design museums blog" with information on design museums
Map of design museums around the world

Types of museums